Scran is a Scottish online resource for educational use by the public, schools, further education and higher education. It presents nearly 490,000 (still and moving) images and sounds contributed by museums, galleries, archives and the media. It was established as an educational charity in 1996 and is now part of Historic Environment Scotland, a registered charity and non-departmental government body.

General description
Scran works in partnership with over 300 cultural institutions in Scotland and the rest of the UK who contribute material to the online service. The online learning resource service hosts nearly 490,000 images, movies and sounds from museums, galleries, archives and the media. Subscribers can download and reuse these for personal and educational use in accordance with the subscriber licence. The online service also provides a range of tools for users "to do stuff with things they find". A number of institutions use Scran's open source online tool - Scran-in-a-Box - to provide access to their own data.

Organisational structure
Until 2008, Scran was a stand-alone charity. From 2008 to 2015 it was managed by The Royal Commission on the Ancient and Historical Monuments of Scotland (RCAHMS), and had two arms: The Scran Trust, a charitable arm that provided educational access to its records, and Scran Ltd., its wholly owned trading arm. In October 2015, RCAHMS merged with Historic Scotland to form a new body, Historic Environment Scotland, and Scran likewise followed and merged into Historic Environment Scotland.

Background information

Formation
Scran was formed in 1996, and its founding partners were The National Museums of Scotland, The Royal Commission on the Ancient and Historical Monuments of Scotland, Museums Galleries Scotland and, by invitation, the Scottish Consultative Council on the Curriculum.

Initial work
In its first five years, it engaged in a wide-ranging scheme of grant awards which allowed cultural organisations to digitise parts of their collections to be made available for educational purposes. This was Millennium Commission funded through the UK Lottery. It developed an advanced licensing system, commended by many, in which the institution retained ownership of the digitised assets, but made these available under licence to Scran. There followed further large grant aid partner projects with NOF Digitise funding through the National Library of Scotland.

Recent work
Scran continues to add records to its database from institutions and individuals. Technical innovations include "Create" functions that allow user creation of instant documents, the ability for users to save their favourite records to a password-protected "Stuff" account and share these with other Scran users, mapping functions and enhanced cross searching such as SRU/SRW.

Technical details

Scope
The service hosts nearly 490,000 resources with additional educational materials and delivers a peak of 1.1 million hits per day.

Software and hardware
Scran utilises open source software and runs on a cluster server configuration with MySQL and PHP under Linux.  The searchable database is over 7GB and total storage including all assets is over 5TB. A number of additional websites are hosted as linked services.

Scran-in-a-Box
The whole system developed by Scran including ScranBase and all the tools like Create and Stuff is available for others to use as Scran-in-a Box. The National Museums Scotland Collections Database, the Scottish Stained Glass Trust, the William Wallace Website, The Virtual Hamilton Palace Trust and Robert Gordon University use "Scran-in-a-Box" tool.

References

External links

 

Archives in Scotland
History websites of the United Kingdom
Charities based in Scotland
Educational organisations based in Scotland
Scottish culture
Museum organizations
Book publishing companies of Scotland